Symphonic Variations may refer to:
 a musical composition consisting of a set of variations on a theme;
 Symphonic Variations (1875) by Johann von Herbeck
 Symphonic Variations on an Original Theme, Op. 78, B. 70 (1877) by Antonín Dvořák
 Symphonic Variations for piano and orchestra (1885) by César Franck
 Symphonic Variations (1897) by Hubert Parry
 Symphonic Variations for piano and orchestra (1918) by Arnold Bax
 Variations Symphoniques for Cello and Orchestra, Op.23 (1893) by Léon Boëllmann
 Symphonic Variations (1931) by Mykola Kolessa
 Symphonic Variations on a Theme of Girolamo Frescobaldi, Op. 20 (1935, rev. 1956, 1965) by Karl Höller
 Symphonic Variations for Piano (1935–37) by Kaikhosru Shapurji Sorabji
 Symphonic Variations for Piano and Orchestra (1935–37, 1953–56), Sorabji's orchestration of the first book of the three-volume Symphonic Variations for Piano, preceded by a newly composed "Introitus" for orchestra alone
 Symphonic Variations (1936–38) by Witold Lutosławski
 Symphonic Variations, Op. 25 (1940–41) by Gunnar de Frumerie
 Symphonic Variations for Wind Orchestra (1977) by 
 Symphonic Variations on "In Dulci Jubilo" (1984) by Claude T. Smith
 Symphonic Variations on "Amazing Grace" (1987) by Claude T. Smith
 Symphonic Variations (1996) by Jacob de Haan
 Symphonic Variations (2004) by 
 Symphonic Variations by Ismayil Hajiyev
 Symphonic Variations on Chopin's Prelude in A, Op. 28/7 (subtitled From the Life of a Nation) by Zygmunt Noskowski
 Symphonic Metamorphosis of Themes by Carl Maria von Weber (1943) by Paul Hindemith (sometimes also known as Symphonic Variations on Themes by Carl Maria von Weber) 
 Symphonic Variations, a ballet choreographed by Frederick Ashton

See also
 Variations for Orchestra
 Variations on a Theme
 Variation (music)